Torkil Nielsen (born 26 January 1964) is a former Faroese football midfielder. He is also one of the Faroe Islands' best chess players.

Club career
He played most of his career at SÍF Sandavágur and after they merged with MB Miðvágur he played with the club which was a result of the merger, FS Vágar. He was an active football player until 1997, after that he just played a few matches and played his last match in 2007, just before the club was re-established into 07 Vestur after a merger between FS Vágar 2004 and SÍ Sørvágur.

International career
Nielsen played in an August 1988 friendly match against Iceland, the country's first FIFA-recognized match. He scored the very first Faroese goal after FIFA recognition, in a game, which also turned out to be the first ever official victory for the Faroe Islands, winning 1–0 in a friendly over Canada in April 1989.

Torkil claimed his place in world football history for his goal in the 1992 European championship qualifying shock 1–0 defeat of Austria in September 1990, which also was the Faroe Islands' first competitive match.
His final match was a June 1993 World Cup qualifying match against Czechoslovakia. He earned 18 caps, scoring 2 goals.

International goals
Scores and results list Faroe Islands' goal tally first.

Chess career
During and after his football career, Torkil Nielsen plays chess with the club Sandavágs talvfelag. He was a three-time individual champion of the Faroes in 1984, 1986 and 1988; and participated three times in the Chess Olympiad as a member of Faroese chess national team - in 1982 in Lucerne, Switzerland, and in 1984 and 1988 in Thessaloniki, Greece.

Personal life
Two of Torkil Nielsen's sons, Rógvi (born 1992) and Høgni Egilstoft Nielsen (born 1997) are also football players as well as chess players, just like their father. His elder son, Rógvi Egilstoft, is also a notable football and chess player. He is a defender for NSÍ Runavík football club and represented Faroes at U-19 level. He was individual chess champion of the Faroes in 2012, 2015 and 2016. He is rated 2334 at the World Chess Federation as of April 2016. Rógvi Egilstoft is also acting mayor of the municipality of Eiði (Eiðis kommuna).

His younger son, Høgni Egilstoft Nielsen, was considered among the most promising chess players of Scandinavia in his age group. In 2014, he won the Faroese Chess Championship for adults at the age of 16, and became the youngest ever to win the championship. Høgni was also the first player ever who won all matches played in a Faroese Chess Championship. Høgni also plays football as a defender for 07 Vestur and also played 10 national matches for the Faroe Islands national football team at U-17 level in 2013. Høgni is rated 2295 at the World Chess Federation as of April 2016.

References

External links
 Goal and other highlights against Austria in 1990

1964 births
Living people
Faroese footballers
Faroese chess players
Association football midfielders
Faroe Islands international footballers